Unite Health Share Ministries (UHSM) is an American 501(c)(3), non-profit, Christian health care sharing ministry established in 2018, and based in Norfolk, Virginia. It provides its services through a contract with the PHCS PPO Network. Like other faith-based initiatives, UHSM is not traditional health insurance, instead providing limited health care services to its members for a monthly fee, pooled to cover all members' qualified health care expenses.

The current president of UHSM is Christopher Jin.

History 
Unite Health Share Ministries was established in 2018 as a Christian, faith-based alternative to traditional health insurance plans. Like other health care sharing ministries, UHSM members pay a fixed monthly premium to help cover the health care expenses of other members.

UHSM was the first health care sharing ministry to offer prescription coverage among its services, though like other faith-based healthcare providers, certain procedures and services are not covered based on ethical beliefs, as they are not required to meet Affordable Care Act standards. They typically limit mental health care to only non-medical providers, and exclude care for substance abuse. Some plans limit coverage to in-hospital care.  All plans require health screening prior to acceptance.  

In 2020, UHSM was awarded a Bronze Stevie Award for Most Valuable Non-Profit Response during the COVID-19 pandemic, working with other organizations  to provide meals and supplies to first responders, and providing access to COVID-19 testing.

References 

Christian organizations based in the United States
Medical and health organizations based in Virginia
Organizations established in 2018
Non-profit organizations based in Virginia
Healthcare cost sharing organizations
Christian organizations established in the 21st century
501(c)(3) organizations